California's 9th congressional district is a congressional district in the U.S. state of California. Josh Harder, a Democrat, has represented the district since January 2023.

Prior to redistricting by the California Citizens Redistricting Commission of 2011, the 9th district encompassed part of the East Bay region of the San Francisco Bay Area. Cities in the district included Oakland, Berkeley and Castro Valley.  Most of that area became parts of 13th district, while the 9th district in 2012 through 2022 was primarily made up of portions of the 18th and 11th districts from the 2002 through 2012.

Since the redistricting prior to the 2012 election, the 9th district centered on Stockton. It consisted of most of San Joaquin County and portions of Contra Costa and Sacramento counties.  Cities in the district include Antioch, Galt, Oakley, Lathrop, Lodi, Mountain House, and Stockton.

With the redistricting in advance of the 2022 elections in California, the 9th district is still centered on Stockton.  However, Tracy, Manteca, and Ripon, which were formerly in California's 10th congressional district, are now part of this district, while Antioch, Lathrop and Brentwood are no longer in the district. Antioch and Brentwood are part of the new 10th district, which is now west of the 9th district (as opposed to south). As of the 2022 elections, Lathrop will be part of the new 13th district.

Competitiveness
John Kerry won the penultimate version of the district in 2004 with 85.9% of the vote. Barack Obama swept the same district in 2008 with 88.13% of the vote while John McCain received 9.87% of the vote,  making it Obama's best and McCain's worst performance in California. The latter version of the 9th district (starting in 2012) was substantially more competitive, though it also favored the Democratic Party. According to poll-aggregation website FiveThirtyEight, the 2022 version of the district leans toward the Democratic Party.

Election results from statewide races

Composition

As of the 2022 redistricting, California's 9th congressional district is located between the Sacramento Valley, Gold Country, and the San Joaquin Valley. It encompasses most of San Joaquin County, and parts of Contra Costa and Stanislaus Counties.

San Joaquin County is split between this district and the 13th district. They are partitioned by Union Pacific, Highway 380, S Tracy Blvd, the California Aqueduct, S Banta Rd, Highway 5, Paradise Cut, S Manthey Rd, Walthall Slough, E West Ripon Rd, Kincaid Rd, Hutchinson Rd, and Stanislaus River. The 9th district takes in the cities of Stockton, Tracy, Manteca, and Lodi.

Contra Costa County is split between this district and the 10th district. They are partitioned by Old River, Italian Slough, Western Farms Ranch Rd, Rankin Rd, Highway J14, Byron Hot Springs Rd, Camino Diablo, Kellogg Creek, Sellers Ave, Brentwood Blvd, Alloro Dr, Ghiggeri Dr, Emilio Dr, Guthrie Ln, Balfour Rd, Chestnut St, Byron Highway, Orwood Rd, Burlington Northern Santa Fe, Werner Dredger Cut, and Rock Slough. The 9th district takes in the census-designated place Discovery Bay.

Stanislaus County is split between this district and the 13th district. Lon Dale Rd, Highway J9, Highway J14, River Rock Rd, Lesnini Creek, Sonora Rd, and Stanislaus River. The 9th district takes in the Woodward Reservoir, and the only census-designated place within it is Valley Home.

Cities & CDP with 10,000 or more people
 Stockton - 320,804
 Tracy - 93,000
 Manteca - 83,498
 Lodi - 67,586

List of members representing the district

Election results

1912

1914

1916

1918

1920

1921 (Special)
Republican Walter F. Lineberger won the special election to replace fellow Republican Charles F. Van de Water, who won the election but died before the 67th Congress convened. Data for this special election is not available.

1922

1924

1926

1928

1930

1932

1934

1936

1938

1940

1942

1944

1946

1948

1950

1952

1954

1956

1958

1960

1962

1964

1966

1968

1970

1972

1974

1976

1978

1980

1982

1984

1986

1988

1990

1992

1994

1996

1998 (Special)

1998

2000

2002

2004

2006

2008

2010

2012

2014

2016

2018

2020

2022

See also
List of United States congressional districts

References

External links

GovTrack.us: California's 9th congressional district

09
Government of Contra Costa County, California
Government of Sacramento County, California
Government of San Joaquin County, California
Antioch, California
Brentwood, California
Lodi, California
Stockton, California
San Joaquin Valley
Constituencies established in 1913
1913 establishments in California